The People of Simlang Valley (Swedish: Folket i Simlångsdalen) is a 1924 Swedish silent drama film directed by Theodor Berthels and starring Mathias Taube, Greta Almroth and Paul Seelig. The film's sets were designed by the art director Bertil Duroj.

Cast
 Mathias Taube as 	Sig Folkeson
 Greta Almroth as Ingrid
 Elly Holmberg as 	Marit
 Ida Schylander as 	Skog-Börta
 Theodor Berthels as 	Lars Brand
 Paul Seelig as 	Sven Brand
 Semmy Friedmann as Tattar-Jan
 Georg Blomstedt as Policeman
 Fridolf Rhudin as Alarik
 Gösta Gustafson as 	Wallenbeck
 Carl Wallin as 	Sibelius

References

Bibliography
 Wallengren, Ann-Kristin.  Welcome Home Mr Swanson: Swedish Emigrants and Swedishness on Film. Nordic Academic Press, 2014.

External links

1924 films
1924 drama films
Swedish drama films
Swedish silent feature films
Swedish black-and-white films
Films based on Swedish novels
Films directed by Theodor Berthels
Silent drama films
1920s Swedish films